George Barber may refer to:

Politicians
 George Philip Barber (1863–1938), Australian politician
 George Barber (politician) (1860–1942), Australian politician
 George W. Barber (politician) South Carolina State Senator

Sportspeople
 George Barber (jumper) (1884–1938), Canadian athlete
 George Barber (footballer), player for Chelsea F.C. 1930–1939
 George Barber (pole vaulter), Canadian pole vaulter
 George W. Barber, American racecar driver and businessman

Others
 George Anthony Barber (1802–1874), English-born Canadian educator, also known as the father of Canadian cricket
 George Franklin Barber (1854–1915), American architect
 George Barber (artist) (born 1958), British video artist
 George Barber, a character in the play  Possible Worlds
 George Calvert Barber (1893–1967), Australian Methodist minister and president-general of the Methodist Church of Australasia 1951–1954